is an interchange railway station in the city of Toyota, Aichi Prefecture, Japan, operated by the third sector Aichi Loop Railway Company, with the Aichi Rapid Transit Company as a tenant.

Lines

Station layout
The Aichi Loop Railway station has two elevated opposed side platforms, with the station building located underneath. The station building has automated ticket machines, TOICA automated turnstiles and is staffed. The Linimo station has one elevated island platform, also with the station underneath.

Platforms

Adjacent stations

Station history
Yakusa Station was opened on January 31, 1988 together with the establishment of the Aichi Loop Railway Company.

Passenger statistics
In fiscal 2017, the Aichi Loop portion of the station was used by an average of 6139 passengers daily and the Linimo Portion of the station was used by 7294 passengers daily.

Surrounding area
 Aichi Institute of Technology

See also
 List of railway stations in Japan

References

External links

Aichi Loop Line home page 
Linimo official home page 

Railway stations in Japan opened in 1988
Railway stations in Aichi Prefecture
Toyota, Aichi